Exalofos is a community of the Lagkadas municipality. Before the 2011 local government reform it was part of the municipality of Vertiskos, of which it was a municipal district. The 2011 census recorded 626 in the community. The community of Exalofos covers an area of 38.097 km2.

Administrative division
The community of Exalofos consists of two separate settlements: 
Pente Vryses (population 322)
Polydendri (population 304)
The aforementioned population figures are from the 2011 census.

See also
 List of settlements in the Thessaloniki regional unit

References

Populated places in Thessaloniki (regional unit)